Bermuda Mystery is a 1944 American mystery film directed by Benjamin Stoloff and written by Scott Darling. The film stars Preston Foster, Ann Rutherford, Charles Butterworth, Helene Reynolds, Jean Howard and Richard Lane. The film was released on May 1, 1944, by 20th Century Fox.

Plot

Cast   
Preston Foster as Steve Carramond
Ann Rutherford as Constance Martin
Charles Butterworth as Dr. Randolph Tilford
Helene Reynolds as Angela 
Jean Howard as Mrs. Valerie Tilford
Richard Lane as Detective Sergeant Donovan
Roland Drew as John Best
John Eldredge as Lyman Brooks
Theodore von Eltz as Lee Cooper
Pierre Watkin as Herbert Bond
Jason Robards, Sr. as Mark Dunham 
Kane Richmond as Frank Martin
Olin Howland as Gas Station Owner

See also
List of American films of 1944

References

External links 
 

1944 films
20th Century Fox films
American mystery films
1944 mystery films
Films directed by Benjamin Stoloff
American black-and-white films
Films scored by Arthur Lange
1940s English-language films
1940s American films